The men's 3000 metre steeplechase at the 2014 European Athletics Championships took place at the Letzigrund on 12 and 14 August. Mahiedine Mekhissi-Benabbad of France won the race, but he was later disqualified after he took off his shirt while running down the home straight. Yoann Kowal (France) was then awarded gold, Krystian Zalewski (Poland) silver and Angel Mullera (Spain) bronze.

Mullera was booed by the public during the medal ceremony. After the French anthem had been played, Kowal joined Zalewski on the silver medal podium step, ostensibly ignoring the Spaniard.

Medalists

Records

Schedule

Results

Round 1

First 5 in each heat (Q) and 5 best performers (q) advance to the Final.

Final

References

Round 1 Results
Final Results

Steeplechase 3000 M
Steeplechase at the European Athletics Championships